Christopher Barton Adkisson (September 30, 1969 – September 12, 1991) was an American professional wrestler, best known under the ring name Chris Von Erich of the Von Erich family.

Professional wrestling career
The smallest and youngest of the Von Erich family, Chris aspired to be a wrestler. He was the youngest son of wrestler Fritz Von Erich. His brothers, Mike, David, Kerry and Kevin all had success as wrestlers. He grew up working cameras and doing other odd jobs backstage for World Class Championship Wrestling (WCCW). He won his first amateur wrestling match at the age of six. He had minor involvement in angles in the 1980s. He performed run-ins to aid his brothers against The Fabulous Freebirds. Chris also smashed Buddy Roberts across the back with a chair, and tackled Gino Hernandez at the Cotton Bowl in 1985 while escaping from having his hair shaved off following a tag-team loss at the hands of the Von Erichs.

Chris became a full-fledged wrestler in 1990. He had a small feud with Percy Pringle in the United States Wrestling Association (USWA) that was seen nationally on ESPN. Chris tagged with both his brother Kevin and longtime ally Chris Adams in several tag team matches against Pringle and Steve Austin; however, he would face only Pringle whenever he was in the ring, and allow his more-experienced partner (Kevin or Adams) to battle Austin. Despite his lack of athleticism, Chris was supported by fans, who would often yell "GO, CHRIS, GO!" during his matches. In one of his early matches, Matt Borne and Pringle faced off against Kerry and Kevin Von Erich. Chris, who was at ringside, was attacked by Borne and Pringle, ramming his head into the ring apron, causing him to have a headache that lasted for five days.

Personal life
Chris grew up with his brothers on 500 acres in Texas. He was the smallest of the brothers at 5'5" and 175 pounds.

Chris had several health problems that limited his success as a wrestler. In addition to asthma, his bones were so brittle from taking prednisone that he would often break them while performing simple wrestling maneuvers. After the 1987 suicide of brother Mike, Chris began to experience depression and drug issues. He was also frustrated of his inability to make headway as a wrestler due to his physical build.

Death
On September 12, 1991, at about 9 P.M., Chris was found by his brother Kevin and mother outside of their family farm in Edom, suffering from a self-inflicted 9mm gunshot wound to the head. According to Kevin, he discovered Chris sitting alone on top of a hill. Chris reassured him, and after Kevin left, shot himself in the head. He was hospitalized at the East Texas Medical Center, shortly after 10 P.M., where he died 20 minutes after arriving, eighteen days before his 22nd birthday. Toxicology reports also revealed cocaine and valium were in his system at the time of his death. Kevin had talked to Chris earlier that day about 100–150 yards north of their home where an apparent suicide note had been left. His interment was located at Grove Hill Memorial Park in Dallas.

Awards and accomplishments
World Wrestling Entertainment
WWE Hall of Fame (Class of 2009)

See also

List of premature professional wrestling deaths

References

External links 
 

1969 births
1991 suicides
20th-century American male actors
20th-century professional wrestlers
American male professional wrestlers
People from Denton, Texas
Professional wrestlers from Texas
Sportspeople from Dallas
Suicides by firearm in Texas
Von Erich family
WWE Hall of Fame inductees